William Hulme may refer to:
William Hulme (British Army officer) (1788–1855), commanded the 96th Regiment of Foot
William Hulme (c.1631–1691), English lawyer, landowner and founder of the Hulme Trust
William Hulme's Grammar School, Manchester, England

See also
William Hume (disambiguation)